Episyron is a genus of wasps in the family Pompilidae which prey on spiders.  Nine species are found in Europe.

Features
Episyron wasps are medium to large in size.  The head and thorax have long, dark clustered hair with spotted abdomens.

Habits
These wasps occur in open sandy habitats where the females can burrow easily to create nests.  They prey on spiders of the families Araneidae, Lycosidae and Tetragnathidae.

Species
Episyron albisquamis Priesner, 1966
Episyron albonotatum (Vander Linden, 1827)
Episyron anticus Haupt 1962
Episyron argillaceus Arnold, 1936
Episyron arizonica Banks 1933
Episyron arnoldi Priesner 1967
Episyron arrogans (Smith, 1873)
Episyron atrytone Banks 1911
Episyron bakeri Banks 1934
Episyron bequaerti Arnold, 1936
Episyron bicinctus Bischoff, 1913
Episyron biguttatus (Fabricius, 1798) Two Spotted Spider Wasp
Episyron binghami Banks 1934
Episyron braunsii  Arnold, 1936
Episyron candiotum Wahis, 1966
Episyron capiticrassum (Ferton, 1901)
Episyron coccineipes (Saunders, 1901)
Episyron conterminus Smith 1885
Episyron corsicus Priesner, 1966
Episyron crassicornis Arnold, 1936
Episyron dimissionis Priesner 1967
Episyron flaveolus Gussakovskij 1928
Episyron fraternus Banks 1946
Episyron froggati Turner 1910
Episyron fuliginosum Wahis 2006
Episyron funerarium (Tournier, 1889)
Episyron gallicum (Tournier, 1889)
Episyron gryps Saussure
Episyron histrio Lepeletier, 1845 
Episyron hopponis (Matsumura 1912)
Episyron insulanus Wolf, 1961
*Episyron intermedius Haupt, 1930
Episyron kaplani Wolf 1998
Episyron kurilense Lelej 1990
Episyron laevis  Banks
Episyron latimarginatus Tsuneki 1989
Episyron levantinum Wahis, 1966
Episyron maehleri Krombein 1948Episyron maneei BanksEpisyron novarae (Kohl 1885)Episyron orbitalis Haupt 1962Episyron ordinarius Priesner, 1966Episyron oregon Evans 1960Episyron pedunculatus Arnold, 1936Episyron pilifrons (Smith 1859)Episyron praestigiosum Wahis 1978Episyron quinquenotatus (Say) white-trimmed black waspEpisyron rufipes (Linnaeus, 1758) red-legged spider waspEpisyron rufotibialis Tsuneki 1989Episyron saussurei Banks 1934Episyron sardonius Priesner, 1966Episyron sardous Wolf, 1961Episyron snowi Banks, 1910 Episyron solitaneum Kohl, 1906Episyron stantoni (Ashmead 1905)*Episyron tertius Blüthgen, 1944Episyron trispinosus Gussakovskii 1952Episyron tristis Priesner 1955Episyron tropicalis Arnold, 1936 Episyron turneri Arnold, 1936 Episyron vagabundum (Smith 1858)Episyron viduus  Arnold 1936Episyron vindex'' Smith, 1879

Taxa marked with an asterisk (*) are of doubtful validity.

References

Hymenoptera of Europe
Hymenoptera genera
Pompilinae
Taxa named by Jørgen Matthias Christian Schiødte